Citizens: A Chronicle of the French Revolution is a book by the historian Simon Schama, published in 1989, the bicentenary of the French Revolution.
"The terror," declared Schama in the book, "was merely 1789 with a higher body count; violence ... was not just an unfortunate side effect ... it was the Revolution's source of collective energy.  It was what made the Revolution revolutionary."  In short, “From the very beginning [...] violence was the motor of revolution.” Schama considers that the French Revolutionary Wars were the logical corollary of the universalistic language of the Declaration of the Rights of Man and of the Citizen, and of the universalistic principles of the Revolution which led to inevitable conflict with old-regime Europe.

Reception
Marxist historian Eric Hobsbawm has described the book in 1990 as being "exceptionally stylish and eloquent" and "extremely well-read." Nevertheless, he considered Citizens to be, above all, a political denunciation of the revolution and a continuation of a tradition in British literature and popular consciousness (established by the writings of Edmund Burke and Thomas Carlyle, reinforced by Dickens' A Tale of Two Cities and promulgated in subsequent pop literature), which has defined the Revolution foremost by the Terror. In Hobsbawm's view, Schama failed to see the positive aspects of the revolution and focused solely on the horror and suffering, presenting them as gratuitous. The author's choice of a narrative focused on particular people and incidents neatly sidesteps the problems of perspectives and generalization."

In his review published in Annales historiques de la Révolution française, Youngstown State University professor Morris Slavin, another Marxist historian, criticized the lack of sympathy displayed by Schama for "the revolutionaries in the real circumstances of a profound social and political crisis", arguing that he judged the events from the standpoint of royalist elites. Echoing Thomas Paine's comment on Edmund Burke, Slavin remarked: "He pities the plumage, but forgets the dying bird". Slavin found it "regrettable that such a capable historian as Schama [...] should be so prejudiced against the Revolution".

Reviewing the book in the journal French Politics and Society, Robert Forster of Johns Hopkins University wrote that "Schama desacralized the Revolution [...] by his inimitable style and wit". Forster praised Schama's analysis of key issues and his descriptive talents, though he criticized what he saw as Schama's overly favorable picture of the French economy and society on the eve of the revolution.

English historian T. C. W. Blanning, who served as Professor of Modern European History at the University of Cambridge, wrote "This extraordinary book identifies and conveys the essence of the Revolution, the key to its appeal, the secret of its power, and the reason for its eventual failure: violence. An astonishing tour de force."

See also  
Historiography of the French Revolution
 The French Revolution: A History by Thomas Carlyle (1837)
 The Old Regime and the Revolution by Alexis de Tocqueville (1856)
 The Oxford History of the French Revolution by William Doyle (1989)
 Echoes of the Marseillaise by Eric Hobsbawm (1990)

References

External links
Booknotes interview with Schama on Citizens, July 14, 1989.
Citizens on Google Books

1989 non-fiction books
Books by Simon Schama
British books
English-language books
History books about the French Revolution
Books about the French Revolution